"Tell The Children" is a single by Sham 69 released in 1980 after their band was disbanded in 1979 from fourth studio album The Game. It reached number 45 on the UK Singles Chart for three weeks.

Track listing 
Side one
 "Tell The Children"

Side two
 "Jack"

References 

1980 singles
1980 songs
Sham 69 songs
Polydor Records singles
Songs written by Jimmy Pursey